Operation West End was the first sting operation done by Tehelka in 2001, an Indian news magazine known for its investigative journalism. It was done in order to expose the defense deals of the then ruling party, the NDA led by  BJP. 

The special correspondents of the magazine filmed several corrupt defense officials and politicians of ruling National Democratic Alliance (NDA) government including the then Bharatiya Janata Party  President Late Bangaru Laxman. The operation took seven and a half months to complete.

The operation 
The magazine created a fictitious London based arms manufacturing company known as West End International. The strategy adopted by the investigative journalists was to get in touch with a person in the lowest end of the defence chain and then move upwards. Therefore, the operation started with the Senior Section Officer P. Sashi who was posted in the Ministry of Defence. His desire to make money from arms dealers provided the starting point for journalists from Tehelka. After getting some monetary incentive, P. Sashi took the team to Brigadier Anil Sehgal’s house in New Delhi. Sehgal was then the Deputy Director in Directorate General of Ordnance and Supply (DGOS), an important army procurement post. Both these officials helped the team with two vital things; information about a defence product required by the Indian army and how to move ahead in order to sell their products.

Brigadier Sehgal demanded to be entertained in a five-star hotel to which the team agreed. The former brought in Lt. Colonel Sharma, who was an army officer posted in Air Force procurement section. After the meeting, Brigadier Sehgal demanded Rs. 200,000 to give documents related to the procurement of hand-held thermal cameras and other equipment that the company might be interested in supplying to the Indian Army. After accepting the money he also advised on how to proceed in the matter of bidding for the hand-held thermal cameras. During the conversation, Brigadier Sehgal said that the company would have to pay to everyone and some percentage would also reach the then Defence Minister George Fernandes. P. Sashi also provided confidential documents related to the procurement of ammunition, tubes, clothing and helicopters.

On 26 November 2000, the team was introduced to Deepak Gupta, the son of Rashtriya Swayamsevak Sangh (RSS) trustee R. K. Gupta. Deepak Gupta assured that he would help the UK based company bag the project and talked about his influence in the government. In the subsequent meetings he elaborated on his functioning and said that he worked from the Prime Minister's Office (PMO).

The team then met R. K. Gupta, the RSS trustee and a big defence middleman. He was quite vocal about his relationship with the Prime Minister Atal Bihari Vajpayee and Lal Krishna Advani and said that both of them were tenants at his properties. He had also helped establish the RSS headquarters in 1967 in Jhandewala, Delhi. He assured the team that he will get their work done and will pay the bribe on their behalf to the Defence Secretary, Joint Secretary, Under Secretary, the then treasurer of the party Ved Prakash Goyal, BJP’s national president Bangaru Laxman. He did not wanted to involve Brajesh Mishra as his price was rupees one crore.

On December 23, 2000, journalists posing as representatives of the arms manufacturing company held their first meeting with the then BJP chief Bangaru Laxma. They then met him several times over the period of one week and promised to compensate him for his recommendation to the Defence Ministry of Supply regarding hand-held thermal imagers. On January 1, 2001, Laxman accepted One lakh rupees at BJP’s office for pursuing their proposal. On January 7, 2001, the final meeting held between the fake representatives and Laxman.

Bribes paid 
The bribes paid during the operation:
 P. Sashi Menon – Rs. 52,000. He was Senior Section Officer, Directorate General of Ordnance and Supply (DGOS)
 Colonel Anil Sehgal – Rs. 40,000. He was Director, Directorate General of Ordnance and Supply (DGOS)
 Brigadier Iqbal Singh – Rs. 50,000. He was Prospective Procurement Officer (PPO).
 Lt. Colonel Sayal – Rs. 80,000. He was ex-official of Directorate General of Ordnance and Supply (DGOS) and a defence middleman.
 Major General S. P. Murgai – Rs. 1,40,000. He was a retired Additional Director General, Quality Assurance.
 Narendra Singh – Rs. 10,000
 H. C. Pant – Rs. 60,000. He was Deputy Secretary, Ministry of Defence
 Jaya Jaitly – Rs. 2,00,000. She was National President of Samta Party
 R. K. Jain – Rs. 50,000. He was National Treasurer of Samta party and a defence middleman
Bangaru Laxman – Rs. 1,00,000. He was National President of Bharatiya Janata Party
 Sathyamurthi – A gold chain. He was the Secretary of Bangaru Laxman
 Raju Venkatesh – Rs. 10,000. He was the Secretary of Bangaru Laxman
 Surendra Sulekha – Rs. 1,00,000. He was an industrialist from Kanpur
 Major General Choudary – Rs. 1,00,000 and a gold chain. He was Additional Director General, Weapons and Equipment (ADE, W.E.)
 Suresh – Rs. 7,000
 Raghupati – Rs. 16,000

Aftermath 
On March 13, 2001, Tehelka released video CDs of the sting operation that led to political storm in India. Subsequently, Bangaru Laxman had to resign from the position of BJP president. It emerged that the defence deals were not driven by considerations of national security, but by the greed of political and bureaucratic people. The defence minister George Fernandes and his party president Jaya Jaitly resigned. Mamata Banerjee, an important ally of the coalition quit the government.

The government booked Tehelka under many sections and used Inland Revenue, Enforcement Directorate and Intelligence Bureau but could not find anything. Investors of the website were also investigated and Tehelka’s financer Shanker Sharma was imprisoned without any charge. The journalists who carried out the investigation were also imprisoned.

Judgement by court 
On April 27, 2012, a special CBI court convicted the former BJP President, Bangaru Laxman of corruption charges. On April 28, 2012, the court sentenced him to four year of rigorous imprisonment and also imposed a fine of one lakh rupees.

Controversy 
The investigation into the sting operation took a dramatic turn when it was revealed that prostitutes were supplied to three defence officials. Both Bhartiya Janta Party (BJP) and Samata Party condemned it and raised the questions on ethical side of investigative journalism. However, Aniruddh Bahal, the journalist who was a part of the operation said, “When the demand came from armymen (to have prostitutes) we were foxed. We resisted it. We were baffled. But the demand was so forceful we could not proceed further without catering to their demand.” They decided to provide prostitutes to show that officials were ready to go to any level.

References

Corruption in India
Political corruption in India
Scandals in India
Investigative journalism
2001 in India